Mötzingen is a village in the district of Böblingen in Baden-Württemberg in Germany.

Mayor
Since February 2008 Marcel Hagenlocher is the mayor of Mötzingen. He is the successor of Thomas Sprißler (born 1966) (Mayor of Mötzingen 1994–2008).

References

Böblingen (district)